Anarta nigrolunata is a moth in the family Noctuidae first described by Alpheus Spring Packard in 1867. It is found in the Arctic and alpine regions of Canada.

Anarta melanopa was considered a synonym of Hadula nigrolunata, but J. Donald Lafontaine and James T. Troubridge state that there are "numerous consistent differences that warrant recognizing them as separate species".

References

External links

Moths of North America
Insects of the Arctic
Moths described in 1867
nigrolunata